Ianthe Elizabeth Brautigan also known as Ianthe Brautigan-Swensen (born 25 March 1960) is an American writer, educator and daughter of author Richard Brautigan.

Biography 
She was born in San Francisco, California to Richard Brautigan and Virginia Dionne Alder. Her parents separated when she was two and she spent most of her young life with her father. Her first book You Can't Catch Death: A Daughter's Memoir was published in 2000. She writes about her father and the impact his suicide had on her own life. She was just nine years old when he first told her that he wanted to kill himself, but she was 24 years old before he finally did so. The book is written in a similar way to her father's work, with short chapters and an impressionistic style. She describes her early life in Montana, spending time with her father and his Beat Generation friends, such as the writers Thomas McGuane and Michael McClure. She travelled with him to Hawaii and Japan.

She married film director Paul Swensen on September 5, 1981, and has one daughter named Elizabeth. She currently lives with her husband in Sonoma County, California, where she teaches English and Creative Writing at Santa Rosa Junior College and Sonoma State University (SSU).

Works
You Can't Catch Death: A Daughter's Memoir (2000)

References

External links
An interview with Ianthe Brautigan on creativity and the creative process -- about-creativity.com March 31, 2008
Information about Ianthe Brautigan from the Brautigan Bibliography and Archive

1960 births
Living people
American memoirists
American women memoirists
Writers from San Francisco
Sonoma State University alumni
San Francisco State University alumni
Educators from California
American women educators
21st-century American women